Wexford County may refer to:

Places
Wexford County, Michigan
County Wexford, Ireland

Ships
USS LST-1168, a United States Navy landing ship tank commissioned in 1954 and renamed USS Wexford County (LST-1168) in 1955
USS Wexford County (LST-1168), a United States Navy landing ship tank in commission from 1954 to 1971
USS Wexford (AK-220)